Olle Eriksson (born 25 October 1928) is a Swedish former footballer and manager. Eriksson made his debut in Allsvenskan in the 1954/1955 season and helped his Halmstads BK finish second. Later in 1960s he became player-manager before joining Varbergs BoIS as head coach.

References

1928 births
Living people
Swedish footballers
Swedish football managers
Association footballers not categorized by position